The Military Secretary is the British Army office with responsibility for appointments, promotion, postings and discipline of high ranking officers of the British Army. It is a senior British Army appointment, held by an officer holding the rank of major-general. The position of Deputy Military Secretary is held by an officer holding the rank of brigadier. The Military Secretary's counterpart in the Royal Navy is the Naval Secretary. The Royal Air Force equivalent is the Air Secretary.

The post was initially established as the Public Secretary or Military Secretary to the Commander-in-Chief of the Forces in 1795 (prior to which a civilian had served as Secretary to the Commander-in-Chief).
 
The title was formally changed to Military Secretary to the Secretary of State for War in 1904. It was sometimes referred to in military jargon as Military Secretary at Headquarters. In 1964 it became Military Secretary to the Secretary of State for Defence.

In 1995 a new Army Personnel Centre was established in Glasgow with the Military Secretary as its Chief Executive.

Military Secretaries
Holders of the post have included:
Colonel Robert Brownrigg, 1795–1803
Colonel William Clinton, 1803–1804
Lieutenant-Colonel James Gordon, 1804–1809
Major-General Sir Henry Torrens, 1809–1820
Lieutenant-General Sir Herbert Taylor, 1820–1827
Lieutenant-General Lord FitzRoy Somerset, 1827–1852
Colonel Richard Airey, 1852–1854
Lieutenant-General Sir Charles Yorke, 1854–1860
Lieutenant-General William Forster, 1860–1871
Major-General Caledon Egerton, 1871–1874
General Sir Alfred Horsford, 1874–1880
Lieutenant-General Sir Edmund Whitmore, 1880–1885
Lieutenant-General Sir George Harman, 1885–1892
General Sir Reginald Gipps, 1892–1896
Major-General Sir Coleridge Grove, 1896–1901
Lieutenant-General Sir Ian Hamilton, 1901–1903
 Lieutenant-General Lord William Frederick Ernest Seymour, acting Nov 1901–1902 (while General Hamilton served in South Africa)
Major-General Sir Ronald Lane, 1903–1904
Colonel John Spencer Ewart, 1904–1906
General Sir Arthur Wynne, 1906–1911
Lieutenant-General Sir William Franklyn, 1911–1914
Lieutenant-General Sir Alfred Codrington, 1914
Major-General Sir Frederick Robb, 1914–1916
Lieutenant-General Sir Francis Davies, 1916–1919
Lieutenant-General Sir Philip Chetwode, 1919–1920
Lieutenant-General Sir Alexander Godley, 1920–1922
Lieutenant-General Sir William Peyton, 1922–1926
Lieutenant-General Sir David Campbell, 1926–1927
Major-General Sir Gerald Boyd, 1927–1930
Lieutenant-General Sir Sidney Clive, 1930–1934
Lieutenant-General Sir Charles Deedes, 1934–1937
Major-General The Viscount Gort, 1937
Lieutenant-General Douglas Brownrigg, 1938–1939
Lieutenant-General George Giffard, 1939–1940
Lieutenant-General Arthur Floyer-Acland, 1940–1942
General Sir Colville Wemyss, 1942–1946
Lieutenant-General Sir Frederick Browning, 1946–1948
Lieutenant-General Sir Charles Keightley, 1948
Lieutenant-General Sir Robert Mansergh, 1948–1949
Lieutenant-General Sir Kenneth McLean, 1949–1951
Lieutenant-General Sir Euan Miller, 1951–1954
Lieutenant-General Sir Colin Callander, 1954–1957
General Sir Hugh Stockwell, 1957–1959
Lieutenant-General Sir Geoffrey Thompson, 1959–1961
Lieutenant-General Sir William Stirling, 1961–1963
General Sir John Anderson, 1963–1966
Lieutenant-General Sir Richard Goodwin, 1966–1969
Lieutenant-General Sir Thomas Pearson, 1969–1972
Lieutenant-General Sir John Sharp, 1972–1974
Lieutenant-General Sir Patrick Howard-Dobson, 1974–1976
Lieutenant-General Sir Robert Ford, 1976–1978
Lieutenant-General Sir Robin Carnegie, 1978–1980
Lieutenant-General Sir Roland Guy, 1980–1983
Lieutenant-General Sir David Mostyn, 1983–1986
Lieutenant-General Sir Patrick Palmer, 1986–1989
Lieutenant-General Sir John Learmont, 1989–1991
Lieutenant-General Sir William Rous, 1991–1994
Major-General Robert Hayman-Joyce, 1994–1995
Major-General Michael Scott, 1995–1997
Major-General David Burden, 1997–1999
Major-General Alistair Irwin, 1999–2000
Major-General Peter Grant Peterkin, 2000–2003
Major-General Freddie Viggers, 2003–2005
Major-General Nicholas Cottam, 2005–2008
Major-General Mark Mans, 2008–2009
Major-General David Rutherford-Jones, 2009–2011
Major-General Andrew Gregory, 2011–2013
Major-General Shaun Burley, 2013–2015
Major-General Nicholas Ashmore, 2015–2017
Major General Robert Bruce, 2017–2019
Major-General Timothy Hyams, 2019–2021
Major-General William Wright, 2021–present

See also
Military Secretary to the India Office

References

Senior appointments of the British Army
War Office
War Office in World War II